was a samurai from Ishikawa Prefecture who was instrumental in the assassination of Ōkubo Toshimichi.

After Saigō Takamori began his uprising in Kagoshima Prefecture in 1877, Chō was among the first of the Kaga Domain (Kanazawa) figures to enact anti-Meiji plans. He traveled twice to Kagoshima Prefecture to meet Saigō.

References

Samurai
1856 births
1878 deaths